The Epigenesis is the  fifth full-length album by the black metal band Melechesh.

Recording
Epigenesis was recorded in Turkey.  Ashmedi explained that this decision was a fit with the band's general approach to music:

Ashmedi confirmed that he recorded the vocals naked, which he described as "ritualistic". He further noted that

Half the bass lines had to be played by Ashmedi due to a technical issue.

Track listing

Personnel

Melechesh
Ashmedi – vocals, twelve-string guitar, electric sitar-guitar, bass, sitar, piano, percussion
Moloch – electric & twelve-string acoustic guitars, baglama saz, bendir
Rahm – bass
Xul – drums, percussion

Additional musicians
Derya Baser, Senem Pirler, Fulya Uçanok – choir & chorus vocals
Reuben De Lautour – choir & chorus vocals, piano
Cahit Berkay – Saz, Tanbour
Harun Kolçak – choir & chorus vocals, acoustic bass
Nevcivan Özel – tar
Eser Taskiran – synthesizers

References

2010 albums
Melechesh albums
Nuclear Blast albums